Beeliar Regional Park is a conservation park approximately  south of the central business district in Perth, Western Australia, located within the Citys of Cockburn, Kwinana and Melville. The regional park is named after the indigenous Beeliar people of the area.

In Western Australia, regional parks consist of areas of land that have been identified as having outstanding conservation, landscape and recreation values. The park contains remnants of the Beeliar Wetlands, part of the once widespread Swan Coastal Plain. 

Beeliar is one of eleven regional parks in the Perth region of Western Australia. The purpose of these regional parks is to serve as urban havens to preserve and restore cultural heritage and valuable ecosystems as well as to encourage sustainable nature-based recreation activities.

History
The concept of regional spaces in Western Australia open to the public was first proposed in 1955, when the Stephenson-Hepburn Report recommended preserving private land for future public use in what would become the Perth Metropolitan Region in 1963. The Environmental Protection Authority (EPA) identified areas of significant conservation, landscape and recreation value in a report in 1983. In 1989, the state Government allocated the responsibility of managing regional parks to the Department of Conservation and Land Management.

A Regional Parks Taskforce was established in 1990 but the EPA reported in 1993 that the establishment of these parks encountered difficulties. Beeliar Regional Park was gazetted in the Government Gazette on 17 January 1995.

Cultural heritage

The area of the Beeliar Regional Park, with its freshwater lakes, was an important camping area and source of food for the Beeliar clan of the Whadjuk people from the Noongar nation. A major trade route connecting the Swan and Murray River passed through the wetlands of what is now Beeliar Regional Park. A number of Aboriginal heritage sites have been identified within the park and the area continues to be of spiritual importance to the local indigenous people.

European settlement of the area was slow because large tracts of land in the area were unsuitable for farming and initial attempts to establish a town in the 1830s failed. By the 1920s, an extensive network of canals had been constructed to drain the wetlands for agricultural use.

Areas

It consists of 19 lakes, arranged in two chains. The park also contains the Henderson coastal limestone cliffs.

Eastern chain 
The main areas from north to south:

Western chain 
The main areas from north to south:

References

External links

 Parks and Wildlife Service: Beeliar Regional Park
 Urban Bushland Council WA Inc.: Beeliar Regional Park

 
Parks in Perth, Western Australia
1995 establishments in Australia
City of Cockburn
City of Kwinana
City of Melville
Noongar placenames